The Battle of Interamna Nahars is a conflict that took place in 253 AD. The Roman Emperor Trebonianus Gallus and his son Volusianus were defeated by Marcus Aemilius Aemilianus in a battle near the town of Interamna Nahars on the Flaminian Way. They fled and were murdered by their own guards at Forum Flaminii.

References

Crisis of the Third Century
Interamna Nahars
253
250s in the Roman Empire
3rd century in Italy
Interamna Nahars